Sar Darreh-ye Qobadi (also Romanized as Sar Darreh-ye Qobādī; also known as Sardāreh and Sar Darreh) is a village in Gavrud Rural District, in the Central District of Sonqor County, Kermanshah Province, Iran. At the 2006 census, its population was 150, in 37 families.

References 

Populated places in Sonqor County